Settlement is the "final step in the transfer of ownership involving the physical exchange of securities or payment". After settlement, the obligations of all the parties have been discharged and the transaction is considered complete.

In the context of securities, settlement involves their delivery to the beneficiary, usually against (in simultaneous exchange for) payment of money, to fulfill contractual obligations, such as those arising under securities trades. Nowadays, settlement typically takes place in a central securities depository. In the United States, the settlement date for marketable stocks is usually 2 business days or T+2 after the trade is executed, and for listed options and government securities it is usually 1 day after the execution. In Europe, settlement date has also been adopted as 2 business days after the trade is executed. As part of performance on the delivery obligations entailed by the trade, settlement involves the delivery of securities and the corresponding payment. A number of risks arise for the parties during the settlement interval, which are managed by the process of clearing, which follows trading and precedes settlement. Clearing involves modifying those contractual obligations so as to facilitate settlement, often by netting and novation.

Securities settlement 

Settlement involves the delivery of securities from one party to another.  Delivery usually takes place against payment known as delivery versus payment, but some deliveries are made without a corresponding payment (sometimes referred to as a free delivery, free of payment or FOP delivery, or in the United States, delivery versus free). Examples of a delivery without payment are the delivery of securities collateral against a loan of securities, and a delivery made pursuant to a margin call.

Nature

Traditional (physical) 
Prior to modern financial market technologies and methods such as depositories and securities held in electronic form, securities settlement involved the physical movement of paper instruments, or certificates and transfer forms.  Payment was usually made by paper cheque upon receipt by the registrar or transfer agent of properly negotiated certificates and other requisite documents. Physical settlement securities still exist in modern markets today mostly for private (restricted or unregistered) securities as opposed to those of publicly (exchange) traded securities; however, payment of money today is typically made via electronic funds transfer (in the U.S., a bank wire transfer made through the Federal Reserve's Fedwire system). Physical/paper settlement involves higher risks, inasmuch as paper instruments, certificates, and transfer forms are subject to risks electronic media are not, such as loss, theft, clerical errors, and forgery (see indirect holding system).

The U.S. securities markets experienced what became known as "the paper crunch", as settlement delays threatened to disrupt the operations of the securities markets which led to the formation of electronic settlement via a central securities depository, specifically the Depository Trust Company (DTC), and ultimately its parent, the Depository Trust & Clearing Corporation. In the United Kingdom, the weakness of paper-based settlement was exposed by a programme of privatisation of nationalised industries in the 1980s, and the Big Bang of 1986 led to an explosion in the volume of trades, and settlement delays became significant.  In the market crash of 1987, many investors sought to limit their losses by selling their securities, but found that the failure of timely settlement left them exposed.

Electronic 
The electronic settlement system came about largely as a result of Clearance and Settlement Systems in the World's Securities Markets, a major report in 1989 by the Washington-based think tank, the Group of Thirty. This report made nine recommendations with a view to achieving more efficient settlement. This was followed up in 2003 with a report, Clearing and Settlement: A Plan of Action, with 20 recommendations.

In an electronic settlement system, electronic settlement takes place between participants. If a non-participant wishes to settle its interests, it must do so through a participant acting as a custodian. The interests of participants are recorded by credit entries in securities accounts maintained in their names by the operator of the system. It permits both quick and efficient settlement by removing the need for paperwork, and the simultaneous delivery of securities with the payment of a corresponding cash sum (called delivery versus payment, or DVP) in the agreed upon currency.

Legal significance 
After the trade and before settlement, the rights of the purchaser are contractual and therefore personal. Because they are merely personal, the purchaser's rights are at risk in the event of the insolvency of the vendor. After settlement, the purchaser owns securities and his rights are proprietary. Settlement is the delivery of securities to complete trades. It involves upgrading personal rights into property rights and thus protects market participants from the risk of the default of their counterparties.

Immobilisation and dematerialisation 
Immobilisation and dematerialisation are the two broad goals of electronic settlement.  Both were identified by the influential report by the Group of Thirty in 1989.

Immobilisation 

Immobilisation entails the use of securities in paper form and the use of a central securities depository or more than one, which is/are electronically linked to a settlement system. Securities (either constituted by paper instruments or represented by paper certificates) are immobilised in the sense that they are held by the depository at all times. In the historic transition from paper-based to electronic practice, immoblisation often serves as a transitional phase prior to dematerialisation.

The Depository Trust Company in New York is the largest immobilizer of securities in the world.  Euroclear and Clearstream Banking, Luxembourg are two important examples of international immobilisation systems. Both originally settled eurobonds, but now a wide range of international securities are settled through them including many types of sovereign debt and equity securities.

Dematerialisation 

Dematerialisation involves dispensing with paper instruments and certificates altogether. Dematerialised securities exist only in the form of electronic records. The legal impact of dematerialisation differs in relation to bearer and registered securities respectively.

Direct holding systems 
In a direct holding system, participants hold the underlying securities directly. The settlement system does not stand in the chain of ownership, but merely serves as a conduit for communications of participants to issuers.

See also
Settlement risk
CLS Group
CREST
Failure to deliver
Regular way contracts
Securities uniform rules (United States)
Subprime mortgage crisis
T2S – being developed harmonised settlement platform in Europe

References

External links 
 
 Host Capture versus Terminal Capture – different options for retail credit card transaction settlement.
 Clearing and Settlement of Exchange-Traded Derivatives by John McPartland (Federal Reserve Bank of Chicago)

 
Securities (finance)
Payments

de:Settlement (Finanzwesen)